Rodrigo Ribeiro may refer to:

 Rodrigo Ribeiro (footballer, born 1978), Brazilian  football centre-back
 Rodrigo Ribeiro (racing driver) (born 1979), Brazilian racing driver
 Rodrigo Ribeiro (footballer, born 2005), Portuguese football forward for Sporting